The  is a truss bridge over the Kiso River in Japan. It is an iron beam bridge which connects Kakamigahara in the Gifu Prefecture with Inuyama in the Aichi Prefecture. The bridge is part of Aichi-Gifu Prefectural Route 17, known as the Kōnanseki Route. The bridge is an essential link in the route from Nagoya and Komaki in Aichi Prefecture to Kakamigahara, Seki, and Gujō in Gifu Prefecture. Because there are no other bridges for  up- or downstream, the bridge is generally congested all day. The bridge was closed for a time in 1999 for maintenance. 

The Aigiōhashi Bridge was featured in Eiji Okuda's film , which was at the Montreal World Film Festival.

Bridges in Japan
Truss bridges
Beam bridges
Buildings and structures in Gifu Prefecture
Buildings and structures in Aichi Prefecture
Inuyama, Aichi